Reedham Orphanage was founded in 1844 in Richmond, London as the Asylum for Fatherless Children by Rev Andrew Reed taking children of both sexes and giving them food, shelter and education until the age of 13 and 14.

History
It quickly outgrew the Richmond premises and relocated Stoke Newington, then to Stamford Hill in 1846. It immediately began fundraising for a new home. The funds for the site were raised by 1853.

The orphanage in Purley, Surrey was opened in 1858 with a capacity of 300.

When Andrew Reed died in 1862 the asylum's name was changed to Reedham in his honour.

The orphanage included a school for the children and a non-sectarian church which was added in 1879.
When the local railway station opened in 1911 it took the Reedham name.
The school was evacuated to Nottingham from July 1944 to June 1945.
The home was closed in 1980 and sold for redevelopment. The proceeds established the Reedham Trust.
The orphanage's Purley site is now occupied by Beaumont Primary School.

Reedham Trust

The Trust fulfills the original intent of the asylum by funding a boarding school education for children who through loss or incapacity of their parents, need to attend a boarding school. Their focus "is on boarding need rather than educational need".

The trust is run from the former lodge building of the orphanage.

See also
 Infant Orphan Asylum
 London Orphan Asylum

External links
 The Reedham Trust
 Reedham Old Scholars Association (ROSA)
 Reedham Orphanage mugs at the Museum of Croydon
 
 
 Girls' Dormitory at Reedham Orphanage, Purley, Surrey 1895 on FotoLibra
 D-D-Drill (1932) on British Pathe
 Old map of 
 City of London Collage
 Photo of the boys at Christmas in the 30s

References

Child welfare in the United Kingdom
1844 establishments in the United Kingdom
Children's charities based in the United Kingdom
Orphanages in the United Kingdom